The 1953 North Sea flood was a major flood caused by a heavy storm surge that struck the Netherlands, north-west Belgium, England and Scotland. Most sea defences facing the surge were overwhelmed, resulting in extensive flooding.

The storm and flooding occurred at the end of Saturday, 31 January 1953 and in the morning of the next day. A combination of a high spring tide and a severe European windstorm caused a storm tide of the North Sea.

Realising that such infrequent events could reoccur, the Netherlands and the UK carried out large studies on strengthening of coastal defences. The Netherlands developed the Delta Works, an extensive system of dams and storm surge barriers. The UK constructed storm surge barriers on the Thames Estuary and on the Hull where it meets the Humber Estuary.

Flooding summary
Such land relies heavily on sea defences and was worst affected, recording 1,836 deaths and widespread damage. Most of the casualties occurred in the southern province of Zeeland.

In England, 307 people were killed in the counties of Lincolnshire, Norfolk, Suffolk and Essex.

Twenty-eight people were killed in the north of West Flanders, Belgium.

Nineteen were killed in eastern Scotland.

At-sea fatalities
More than 230 deaths occurred on seacraft along Northern European coasts as well as on ships in deeper waters of the North Sea. The ferry MV Princess Victoria sank in the North Channel east of Belfast with 133 fatalities, and many fishing trawlers sank. Nine small vessels foundered in the seas around the British Isles with the loss of all hands; these included the Swedish steamer Aspo (22 crew lost), the British steamer Yewvalley (12 crew lost), the British trawlers Sheldon (14 crew lost), Michael Griffith (13 crew lost) and Guava (eleven crew lost), the Dutch motor vessels Salland (nine crew lost) and Westland (eight crew lost), the Dutch trawler Catharina Duyvis (16 crew lost), and the Belgian trawler Leopold Nera (five crew lost).

Netherlands 

From midday on 31 January 1953, water was driven from the northern reaches of the North Sea between Norway and Scotland by a strong north-west gale. A surge developed along the coast of the Netherlands, which coincided with a high spring tide, leading to many water levels on the Dutch coast on the morning of 1 February 1953 being higher than any previous recorded figures, particularly in the south-western areas of the country.

At 10:30 p.m. on Saturday evening 31 January, it was low tide. But this time the water remained high. The strength of the hurricane had broken the tidal movement.

On the night of 1 February 1953 around 3 a.m., many dykes in the province of Zeeland, the southern parts of the province of South Holland and the northwestern parts of the province of North Brabant proved unable to resist the combination of spring tide and a northwesterly storm. On both the islands and the mainland, large areas of the country were flooded.

At 4 p.m. on 1 February, the flood reached a second high. The water rose even higher than during the first flood, and more dikes broke. Many people who had survived the first flood died, as the houses on which they sheltered on the rooftops collapsed due to the persistent water pressure. At that time, the government did not yet know that Schouwen-Duiveland, Goeree-Overflakkee and Tholen were almost completely under water, and no large-scale rescue operations had yet taken place.

Only on Monday 2 February were fishermen the first to sail deep into the disaster area to save hundreds of people. Rescue operations from the air were hardly possible: the Netherlands had only 1 helicopter and had to wait until other countries offered help.

On Tuesday February 3, a large flow of people and relief supplies started. Planes dropped sandbags, dinghies, boots, food and water over the disaster area. At the same time, thousands of Dutch soldiers, administrators, aid workers and volunteers arrived to carry out coordinated actions in the disaster area. Tens of thousands of residents were being evacuated from the area to shelters elsewhere in the country.

Foreign helicopters and amphibious vehicles also came into action on Tuesday, but the vast majority of rescue operations had already been completed by then.

Donations and relief supplies were pouring in at the National Disaster Fund in The Hague. Other countries, including England, Sweden and Canada sent more than 61 million guilders in relief supplies.

Warnings 
Rijkswaterstaat had warned about the risk of a flood. At the time of the flood, none of the local radio stations broadcast at night, and many of the smaller weather stations operated only during the day. The following broadcast from the Royal Netherlands Meteorological Institute (KNMI) was made at 6.15pm (18:15) on January 31 1953 on Hilversum Radio:

Another warning was broadcast shortly before midnight on 31 January 1953, followed by the Wilhelmus, after which broadcasts ceased for the evening, as was standard in the Netherlands at the time. As a result, the warnings of the KNMI did not penetrate the flood-threatened area in time. People were unable to prepare for the impending flood. The disaster struck on a Saturday night, and hence many government and emergency offices in the affected area were not staffed.

As telephone and telegraph networks were disrupted by flood damage, amateur radio operators went into the affected areas with their equipment to form a voluntary emergency radio network. These radio amateurs provided radio communications for 10 days and nights, and were the only people able to maintain contact from affected areas with the outside world.

Resulting damage 

The Zeeland dykes were breached in 67 locations. Large parts of South Holland, Zeeland and North Brabant were inundated. In North Holland only one polder was flooded. The most extensive flooding occurred on the islands of Schouwen-Duiveland, Tholen, Sint Philipsland, Goeree-Overflakkee, the Hoeksche Waard, Voorne-Putten and Alblasserwaard. Parts of the islands of Zuid-Beveland, Noord-Beveland, IJsselmonde, Pernis, Rozenburg, Walcheren and Land van Altena were flooded, as well as parts of the areas around Willemstad, Nieuw-Vossemeer and parts of Zeelandic Flanders.

The highest death tolls were recorded on the islands of Schouwen-Duiveland and Goeree-Overflakkee. 305 People drowned in the village of Oude-Tonge. 20-year-old Jos de Boet from Oude-Tonge lost 42 family members in the disaster. 200,000 Animals died, 3,500 houses and farms were lost in the flood, and another 43,000 were severely damaged. 

Afterwards, the government formed the Delta Commission to study the causes and effects of the floods. They estimated that flooding killed 1,835 people and forced the emergency evacuation of 70,000 more. Floods covered 9% of Dutch farmland, and sea water flooded  of land. An estimated 30,000 animals drowned, and 47,300 buildings were damaged, of which 10,000 had to be demolished (or were swept away). The total damage is estimated at 1 billion Dutch guilders.

Near flooding of other parts 
The Schielands Hoge Zeedijk (Schielands High Seadyke) along the river Hollandse IJssel was all that protected three million people in the provinces of North and South Holland from flooding. A section of this dyke, known as the Groenendijk, was not reinforced with stone revetments. The water level was just below the crest and the seaward slope was weak.

Volunteers worked to reinforce this stretch. However, the Groenendijk began to collapse under the pressure around 5:30 am on 1 February. Seawater flooded into the deep polder. In desperation, the mayor of Nieuwerkerk commandeered the river ship de Twee Gebroeders (The Two Brothers) and ordered the owner to plug the hole in the dyke by navigating the ship into it. Fearing that the ship might break through into the polder, Captain Arie Evegroen took a row boat with him. The mayor's plan was successful, as the ship was lodged firmly into the dyke, reinforcing it against failure and saving many lives.

The Afsluitdijk across the entrance of the Zuiderzee was said to have paid for its construction cost in that one night, by preventing destructive flooding around the three great meers that used to be the Zuiderzee.

Reaction 
Several neighbouring countries sent soldiers to assist in searching for bodies and rescuing people. The U.S. Army sent helicopters from Germany to rescue people from rooftops. Queen Juliana and Princess Beatrix visited the flooded area only a few days after. A large aid program, the National Relief Fund, was launched, and soldiers raised funds by selling pea-soup door to door. Internationally, 100,000 commemorative postcards, featuring an illustration by Eppo Doeve, were sold. A national donation program was started and there was a large amount of international aid. The Red Cross was overwhelmed by contributions, and diverted some of the funds to assist residents of Third World countries.

It was found that the flooding could have been  higher; the Rijkswaterstaat's plan concerning the protection and strengthening of the dikes was accepted.  As a result, the Delta Works were authorized, an elaborate project to enable emergency closing of the mouths of most estuaries, to prevent flood surges upriver.

Britain 

The North Sea flood of 1953 was the worst flood of the 20th century in England and Scotland. Over  of coastline was damaged, and sea walls were breached in 1,200 places, inundating . Flooding forced over 30,000 people from their homes,  and 24,000 properties were greatly damaged. The damage is estimated as £50 million at 1953 prices, approximately £1.2 billion at 2013 prices.

Probably the most devastating storm to affect Scotland for 500 years, the surge crossed between Orkney and Shetland. The storm generated coastal and inland hazards, including flooding, erosion, destruction of coastal defences, and widespread wind damage. Damage occurred throughout the country, with 19 fatalities reported. The fishing village of Crovie (then in Banffshire, now Aberdeenshire), built on a narrow strip of land along the Moray Firth coast, was abandoned by many, as large structures were swept into the sea.

The surge raced down the east coast into the mid-to-southern North Sea, where it was amplified by shallower waters.

On the north side of the Thames Estuary Canvey Island in Essex was inundated, with the loss of 58 lives. Some 41 people died at Felixstowe in Suffolk when wooden prefabricated homes in the West End of the town were flooded. Another 37 died when the seafront village of Jaywick near Clacton was flooded.

Police Officers Charles Lewis and Leonard Deptford received George Medals for their part in rescue work. Lewis leapt from a police station upper window to save an elderly couple being swept away in  floodwater, carrying them to a house across the road to safety, then continuing rescue work for hours until he found a working telephone to call for help. Deptford was off-duty at his son's party when the wall of water hit. He realised that elderly people were vulnerable as the sea wall was breached and he dragged and carried many to safety. At one house he found a bedridden elderly couple with their middle-aged daughter; in the waist-high floodwater, he lashed together oil cans to make a raft, to which he tied the couple and pulled them to safety. He carried on into day light, his last rescue being a dog.

Reis Leming, a US airman, and USAF Staff Sergeant Freeman A Kilpatrick were also awarded the George Medal for rescuing respectively 27 and 18 people at South Beach, Hunstanton. At Salthouse the Victorian Randall's Folly was badly damaged, resulting in its subsequent demolition.

In south-west Essex, water overspilled the Royal Docks into Silvertown, where it drained into the sewers but flooded back in Canning Town and Tidal Basin. William Hayward, a night watchman at William Ritchie & Son, died of exposure to gas from a damaged pipe – the only fatality in London. Almost 200 people were homeless and took refuge at Canning Town Public Hall. The village of Creekmouth on Barking Creek, the mouth of the Roding, was wholly flooded by the sea surge and later demolished. Residents were relocated elsewhere in Barking.

The total death toll on land in Britain is estimated at 307.

Belgium 
The coastal defence of Flanders was severely damaged. Near Ostend, Knokke and Antwerp, heavy damage was done to the sea defence with local breaches. Twenty-eight people died, including musician Robert Dubois.

Responses 
After the 1953 flood, governments realised that similar infrequent but devastating events were possible in the future. In the Netherlands the government conceived and constructed an ambitious flood defence system beginning in the 1960s. Called the Delta Works, it is designed to protect the estuaries of the rivers Rhine, Meuse and Scheldt. The system was completed in 1998, with completion of the storm surge barrier Maeslantkering in the Nieuwe Waterweg, near Rotterdam.

In the UK, the Permanent Secretary to the Home Office, Sir Frank Newsam, coordinated the immediate efforts to defend homes, save lives and recover after the floods. After the flooding, the government made major investments in new sea defences. The Thames Barrier programme was started to secure Central London against a future storm surge; the Barrier was officially opened on 8 May 1984. A range of flood defence measures were initiated around the UK coast.

Commemoration 

In 2013 a service was held at Chelmsford Cathedral to mark the 60th anniversary of the Great Flood, attended by Anne, Princess Royal. Acts of remembrance were also held in Lincolnshire, Norfolk, Suffolk and Essex.

A blue plaque marking the level of the flood water was installed by the Leigh Society on the wall of the Heritage Centre in Leigh-on-Sea to commemorate the flooding there.

There is also a blue plaque marking the height of the flood water at Sutton-on-Sea in Lincolnshire.

In 2011 58 years after the flood, a service of remembrance was held outside the library on Canvey Island in Essex to unveil a plaque commemorating the 58 people who lost their lives on the island.

The Watersnoodmuseum or Flood Museum in Ouwerkerk, Netherlands opened in 2001 as the "National Knowledge and Remembrance Centre for the Floods of 1953".

Books, films and music 
 The composition Requiem Aeternam 1953 by Douwe Eisenga was written as a commemoration of the flood.
 The composition Noye's Fludde of 1958 by Benjamin Britten evokes the memory of the North Sea flood.
 The Dutch public broadcasting foundation has made numerous documentaries about the North Sea Flood. Two have been adapted as English versions: The Greatest Storm and 1953, the Year of the Beast.
 BBC Timewatch made a documentary about the North Sea flood of 1953, called The Greatest Storm.  BBC Radio Four broadcast in 2023 an account of the flood and lessons learned, such as the Thames Barrier: 
 An episode of the ITV series Savage Planet featured the flood.
 The 1953 floods were mentioned in detail in the drama film Flood (2007).
 In 2009 a Dutch action drama titled De Storm (The Storm) was released.
 The book The Little Ark by Jan de Hartog, published in 1953, depicted the flood. It was adapted as a film by the same name in 1972.
 The short story "The Netherlands Lives with Water", by Jim Shepard, contains a passage describing the event.
 The 1976 book Oosterschelde, windkracht 10, by Jan Terlouw is the story of the flood in Zeeland, Netherlands.  The first part describes the storm, while the second part describes the later conflicts about constructing the Delta Works.
 Penelope Fitzgerald, The Bookshop (1978), set in Suffolk in 1959, makes many references back to the 1953 flooding.
 The 2012 non-fiction book, The Sugar Girls, by Duncan Barrett and Nuala Calvi, describes the effects of the flood in East London, and on workers at Tate & Lyle's East End factories.
 The flood and its effect upon the coastal town of Lowestoft is the subject matter of a painting by British artist Mark Burrell.
'The Great Tide' by Hilda Grieve (published 1959) gives a detailed description of every aspect of the flood in Essex. The author was an experienced historian, commissioned by the Essex County Council.

See also 
 Flood control in the Netherlands
 Floods in the Netherlands
 Inundation of Walcheren
 Lists of disasters
 List of floods in Europe
 List of natural disasters in the British Isles
 List of disasters in Great Britain and Ireland by death toll
 North Sea flood of 1962
 North Sea flood of 2007
 North Sea flood of 2013
 Radio Amateurs Emergency Network
 Storm tides of the North Sea

References 

 Kelman, Ilan. Assessment of UK deaths, 1953; study made for CURBE (Cambridge University Centre for Risk in the Built Environment)
 Lamb, H.H. and Frydendahl, Knud (1991). Historic Storms of the North Sea, British Isles and Northwest Europe. Cambridge University Press. 
 Instituut voor Sociaal Onderzoek van het Nederlandse Volk, U.S. National Research Council. Committee on Disaster Studies (1955). Studies in Holland flood disaster 1953. Four volumes.

External links 
 RAF Sculthorpe Heritage Centre 1953 Floods
 BBC — future flood risk
 The Flood of 1953 in the Netherlands . Report on DeltaWorks.org; includes animations, images and video
 1953 Floods
 Suffolk under water — BBC Suffolk
 LIFE Magazine article (Feb. 16, 1953)

Video links 
 Dutch newsreel, on Pathe site 
 Pathe newsreel, images of Netherlands 
 Pathe newsreel, images of Netherlands
 Pathe newsreel, images of Canvey
 Pathe newsreel, evacuation in Lincolnshire

1953 floods in Europe
1953 in Belgium
1953 in England
1953 in Scotland
1953 in the Netherlands
1953 disasters in the United Kingdom
1953 meteorology
1953 natural disasters 
January 1953 events in Europe
February 1953 events in Europe
Amateur radio emergency communications
Amateur radio history
Disasters in Norfolk
Disasters in Suffolk
European windstorms
Floods in Belgium
Floods in England
Floods in Europe
Floods in Scotland
Floods in the Netherlands
Disasters in Essex
History of Lincolnshire
History of North Brabant
History of South Holland
History of Zeeland
History of the North Sea
Natural disasters in Belgium
Rhine–Meuse–Scheldt delta
Storm tides of the North Sea
1953 in radio
1953 disasters in Europe
1953 disasters in Belgium
1953 disasters in the Netherlands